Alex McSweeney is a British actor, best known for playing Graham Foster in EastEnders from 2003 to 2005. Other programmes he has appeared in include Silent Witness and Holby City. He also appeared in Lewis, in 2007. He has also portrayed 'Captain Wilder' in the third series of the ITV show Primeval in 2009. He was also a regular guest actor on The Bill between 1994 and 2003, before taking on the role of series regular David Radford in 2004.

Career
Following training at London Academy of Performing Arts (LAPA), and the Academy Drama School, he appeared in such roles as 'One Ball Bill' in Keen Eddie comedy-drama television series for the Fox network, alongside Sienna Miller in 2003.
He was in Steven Berkoff's groundbreaking production of On The Waterfront at the Theatre Royal Haymarket in 2008.
In the summer of 2011, while performing in Steven Berkoff's "Oedipus" at the Edinburgh Fringe Festival, Alex directed a cast of young actors in the play A Hero of Our Time. The play, written by Alex was a take on the Russian Novel by Mikhail Lermontov and was generally received well by critics.
He played the recurring role of D.S. Sykes in Hollyoaks from 2013 until his character was killed by gangster Fraser Black in April 2014. 
He played a lecturer who has a motorbike accident in BBC Doctors in 2015.
In an episode of Call the Midwife (March 2016), he played Joe Blacker.

Alongside his acting career, he is also a Doctor of Literature and lectures at two London Universities in English & Drama. Drama at Kingston University and is a Senior Lecturer in English and Creative Writing at London Southbank University. 
He wrote 'Out of the Cage' a play about women munition workers in the First World War in 2013/14. It subsequently got published and premiered at the Park Theatre London in January 2015. A national tour of the play was put in motion for 2017.
He then appeared in Endeavour in 2017 as 'Terence Bakewell'.

Filmography

Films

TV

References

External links

British male soap opera actors
Living people
Alumni of London South Bank University
Year of birth missing (living people)
Academics of Kingston University